Mitti: Back to the roots is a 2018 Indian Hindi-language crowd-funded docudrama film written by Rajnish Sharma and directed by Anshul Sinha. Music composed by P.V.R. Raja.

Plot 
The film is about farmer suicides and the agrarian crisis which talks about 27 major issues of farmers and provide practical solutions.

References

External links